The Commendation for Brave Conduct is a bravery decoration awarded to Australians. It is awarded for an act of bravery that is worthy of recognition. The Commendation for Brave Conduct was created in February 1975. The decorations recognise acts of bravery by members of the community who selflessly put themselves in jeopardy to protect the lives or property of others. It is ranked fourth in the Australian bravery decoration in the Australian Honours System.

Description 
The Commendation for Brave Conduct is a silver gilt sprig of mimosa mounted on a blood-red backing ribbon.

See also 
Australian Honours Order of Precedence

References

Civil awards and decorations of Australia
1975 establishments in Australia
Awards established in 1975